District 4 is the smallest urban district (quận) of Ho Chi Minh City, the largest city in Vietnam. The Saigon Port is located here.

As of 2010, the district had a population of 183,261 and a total area of 4 km². A number of large apartment buildings have been built over the past decade in District 4 including Rivergate Residence, Millenium, Galaxy 9, and Icon 56.

Geographical location

District 4 is a triangular cay, surrounded by rivers and canals. It borders Saigon River and the city of Thủ Đức to the northeast, Bến Nghé River and District 1 to the northwest, and Tẻ Canal and District 7 to the south.

There are 15 wards in District 4.

On January 11, 1985, the district consisted of five wards, namely:

Vĩnh Hội Ward (which is now divided into four wards numbered 1-4);
Lý Nhơn Ward (which is now divided into three wards numbered 5, 6 and 8);
Cây Bàng Ward (which is now divided into two wards, numbered 9 and 10);
Xóm Chiếu Ward (which is now divided into three wards, numbered 12-14) and
Khánh Hội Ward (which is now divided into three wards, numbered 15, 16 and 18).

As time went on, these wards split up into between two and four wards each, now giving a total of 15 wards, numbered 1-18. Wards 7, 11 and 17 do not exist.

References

Districts of Ho Chi Minh City